Turfhall Park was a cricket ground in Cape Town, South Africa.

History
The Western Province cricket team first played first-class cricket at the ground against Natal in the 1975–76 Stellenbosch Farmers Winery Trophy. The ground played host to Western Province in a further two first-class matches in 1976, before hosting them in 1978 in the final first-class match to be played at the ground. Cricket is no longer played at Turfhall Park, with a series of softball pitches replacing the cricket ground.

Records

First-class
Highest team total: 303 all out by Western Province v Transvaal, 1975–76
Lowest team total: 67 all out by Western Province v Transvaal, as above
Highest individual innings: 77 by Brian O'Connell for Western Province v Transvaal, as above
Best bowling in an innings: 7–35 by Rushdi Magiet for Western Province v Transvaal, 1978–79
Best bowling in a match: 9–46 by Winston Carelse for Western Province v Transvaal, 1975–76

See also
List of cricket grounds in South Africa

References

External links
Turfhall Park at ESPNcricinfo

Cricket grounds in South Africa
Defunct cricket grounds in South Africa
Sports venues in Cape Town
Softball venues